Ponarth Church was a Protestant church in the Ponarth quarter of Königsberg, Germany.

The brick Neo-Gothic church of Ponarth was built in May 1896 and dedicated on 23 July 1897; its construction was championed by the mayor, Robert Hoffmann, and the director of the brewery, Eduard Schifferdecker. The Protestant congregation was separated from that of Haberberg in 1905 and became its own parish. Its pastors were Johannes Joachim, Leop. Beckmann, Gerh. Symnanowski, and Helmut Hildebrandt.

The church was lightly damaged during World War II and was in continual use by the remaining Germans until their expulsion in 1947. Residents of Kaliningrad, Russia, used it first for storage and then as a gym. In the early 1980s the roof tiles were replaced with cement. Since 21 September 1992 it has been a Russian Orthodox church.

Notes

References

1945 disestablishments in Germany
19th-century churches in Germany
Churches in Kaliningrad
Former churches in Königsberg
Gothic Revival church buildings in Russia
Churches completed in 1896
Church buildings converted to a different denomination
Cultural heritage monuments of regional significance in Kaliningrad Oblast